Serra e Junceira is a civil parish in the municipality of Tomar, Portugal. It was formed in 2013 by the merger of the former parishes Serra and Junceira. The population in 2011 was 2,080, in an area of 46.57 km².

References

Freguesias of Tomar